Miklós Izsó (September 9, 1831, Disznós-Horvát (now "Izsófalva", Borsod-Abaúj-Zemplén County, north-east Hungary) - May 29, 1875, Budapest) was a Hungarian sculptor whose sculptural style integrated elements of classicism and academic style.

References

External links

Biography and works of Miklós Izsó

19th-century Hungarian people
Hungarian sculptors
Hungarian expatriates in Austria
Hungarian expatriates in Germany
Hungarian Revolution of 1848
People from Borsod-Abaúj-Zemplén County
19th-century deaths from tuberculosis
1831 births
1875 deaths
Academy of Fine Arts Vienna alumni
Burials at Kerepesi Cemetery
19th-century sculptors
Tuberculosis deaths in Bulgaria